Flybar may also refer to an element of the helicopter rotor.

The Flybar is a modification of the traditional pogo stick design which allows riders to propel themselves up to a world record 8 feet 6 inches into the air according to the Flybar's website. Developed in a collaborative effort between SBI Enterprises, Bruce Middleton and Andy Macdonald, it utilizes in place of the usual steel spring in a regular pogo stick 12 elastic bands used for propulsion, also known as thrusters. It weighs 20 pounds (9 kilograms) and is capable of producing up to 1,200 pounds-force (5,300 newtons) of thrust. The Flybar comes in another model, the Flybar 800, which is intended for lighter people.

See also
 Stunt Pogo
 Pogo Stick
 Vurtego
 Powerbocking

References

External links
 Flybar Website
 Flybar Fan Website

Physical activity and dexterity toys